Jacques Charles François Sturm (29 September 1803 – 15 December 1855) was a French mathematician.

Life and work 
Sturm was born in Geneva (then part of France) in 1803.  The family of his father, Jean-Henri Sturm, had emigrated from Strasbourg around 1760—about 50 years before Charles-François's birth. His mother's name was Jeanne-Louise-Henriette Gremay. In 1818, he started to follow the lectures of the academy of Geneva. In 1819, the death of his father forced Sturm to give lessons to children of the rich in order to support his own family. In 1823, he became tutor to the son of Madame de Staël.

At the end of 1823, Sturm stayed in Paris for a short time following the family of his student. He resolved, with his school-fellow Jean-Daniel Colladon, to try his fortune in Paris, and obtained employment on the Bulletin universel. In 1829, he discovered the theorem that bears his name, and concerns real-root isolation, that is the determination of the number and the localization of the real roots of a polynomial.

Sturm benefited from the 1830 revolution, as his Protestant faith ceased to be an obstacle to employment in public high schools. At the end of 1830, he was thus appointed as a professor of Mathématiques Spéciales at the collège Rollin.

He was chosen a member of the Académie des Sciences in 1836, filling the seat of André-Marie Ampère. Sturm became répétiteur in 1838, and in 1840 professor in the École Polytechnique. His works, Cours d'analyse de l'école polytechnique (1857–1863) and Cours de mécanique de l'école polytechnique (1861), were published after his death in Paris, and were regularly republished.

He was the co-eponym of the Sturm–Liouville theory with Joseph Liouville.

In 1826, with his colleague Jean-Daniel Colladon, Sturm helped make the first experimental determination of the speed of sound in water.

In 1851 his health began to fail.  He was able to return to teaching for a while during his long illness, but in 1855 he died.

The asteroid 31043 Sturm is named for him. Sturm's name is one of the 72 names engraved at the Eiffel Tower.

Distinctions

 Grand prix de Mathématiques (4 December 1834)
 Member of the academy of Berlin (1835)
 Member of the academy of Saint-Petersburg (1836)
 Officier de la Légion d'Honneur (1837)
 Copley Medal of the Royal Society of London (1840)
 Member of the  Royal Society of London (1840)

Selected writing 

 
 
 Cours d'analyse de l'Ecole polytechnique. Tome premier (Gauthier-Villars, 1877)
 Cours d'analyse de l'Ecole polytechnique. Tome second (Gauthier-Villars, 1877)
 Cours de mécanique de l'Ecole polytechnique (Gauthier-Villars, 1883)

See also 
Control theory
Oscillation theory
Spectral theory of ordinary differential equations
Submarine signals

References

External links

 

1803 births
1855 deaths
Members of the French Academy of Sciences
Officiers of the Légion d'honneur
Recipients of the Copley Medal
19th-century French mathematicians
Scientists from Geneva